Golders Green Jewish Cemetery, usually known as Hoop Lane Jewish Cemetery, is a Jewish cemetery in Golders Green, London NW11. It is maintained by a joint burial committee representing members of the West London Synagogue and the S&P Sephardi Community (the Spanish and Portuguese Jews Congregation).

Location
The cemetery is located on Hoop Lane, in Golders Green in the London Borough of Barnet, across the street from the Golders Green Crematorium. Just inside the gates is a small building, with two halls for burial services, and a drinking fountain. North Western Reform Synagogue is located in Alyth Gardens, on the boundary of the cemetery.

History
The cemetery,  which was opened in 1895, is divided into two parts. On the West Side, used by West London Synagogue, the graves are marked with upright stones. The East Side, used by the Spanish and Portuguese Jews' Congregation, is organised in the form of traditional Sephardi cemetery (one of the few left in London); the gravestones are laid horizontally, as traditionally the burial ground was too unstable for an upright stone.

Notable burials

East Side
 Hakham Moses Gaster (1856–1939),  Romanian, later British, scholar, the Hakham of the Spanish and Portuguese Jewish congregation in London, and a Hebrew and Romanian linguist 
 Philip Guedalla (1889–1944), English barrister, popular historical and travel writer, and biographer
 Nathan Saatchi (1907–2000), Iraqi-born British businessman, a textile merchant who moved from Baghdad to London

West Side

Musicians
 Jacqueline du Pré (1945–1987), internationally acclaimed cellist, who converted to Judaism in 1967 and died from multiple sclerosis, aged only 42
 Maurice Jacobson (1896–1976), pianist, composer and music publisher
 Paul Kossoff (1950–1976), rock guitarist best known as a member of Free

Philanthropists
 Sir Basil Henriques (1890–1961),  philanthropist who wrote reforms to religious Jewish ceremonies and set up boys' clubs for deprived Jewish children
 Sir Sigmund Sternberg (1921–2016), philanthropist, interfaith campaigner, businessman and Labour Party donor

Politicians
 Leslie Hore-Belisha, 1st Baron Hore-Belisha (1893–1957), British  Liberal politician
 Gerald Isaacs, 2nd Marquess of Reading (1889–1960), British Conservative politician and barrister
 Rufus Isaacs, 1st Marquess of Reading (1860–1935), British Liberal politician and barrister, buried at this cemetery after cremation
 Sir Philip Magnus (1842–1933), educational reformer and Liberal Unionist MP
 Sir Harry Samuel (1853–1934), Conservative Member of Parliament who campaigned against free trade during his political career
 Sir John Simon (1873–1854), British Liberal politician and barrister

Rabbis and teachers
 Rabbi Dr Leo Baeck (1873–1956), rabbi, scholar and theologian, who led the Reform Judaism movement in Germany and, after settling in London, chaired the World Union for Progressive Judaism
 Rabbi  Charles Berg (1911–1979), the first non-Orthodox rabbi to be ordained in England
 Rabbi Curtis Cassell (1912–1998),  rabbi in Germany, Britain and Rhodesia (now Zimbabwe)
 Rabbi Albert Friedlander (1927–2004), German-born rabbi in the United States and in Britain, who also taught at Leo Baeck College, London and became Vice President of the World Union for Progressive Judaism
 Rabbi Hugo Gryn (1930–1996), rabbi, broadcaster and Auschwitz survivor
 Professor Hans Liebeschuetz (1893–1978), medieval historian best known for his study of John of Salisbury
 Rabbi Dr Arthur Löwenstamm (1882–1965), theologian, writer and rabbi in Berlin and in London
 Rabbi Ignaz Maybaum (1897–1976), rabbi and theologian
 Rabbi Dr Harold Reinhart  (1891–1969), American-born rabbi who was senior minister at West London Synagogue and the founding rabbi of Westminster Synagogue
 Professor Ben Segal (1912–2003), Professor of Semitic Languages at SOAS University of London 
 Rabbi Dr Werner van der Zyl (1902–1984), rabbi in Berlin and London. Van der Zyl was a founder and President of Leo Baeck College, London, and also President of the Reform Synagogues of Great Britain (now known as the Movement for Reform Judaism); he was also Life Vice President of the World Union for Progressive Judaism.

Writers
 Sholem Asch (1880–1957), Polish-Jewish novelist, dramatist and essayist in the Yiddish language
Marjorie Proops (1911–1996), agony aunt, who wrote the column Dear Marje for the Daily Mirror newspaper
 Jack Rosenthal (1931–2004), playwright, who wrote early episodes of ITV's Coronation Street and over 150 screenplays, including original TV plays, feature films, and adaptations

Others
Emanuel Raphael Belilios (1837–1905), a Hong Kong opium dealer and businessman
Julia Goodman (née Salaman; 1812–1906), portrait painter
 Stirling Henry Nahum (1906–1956), known professionally as Baron, society and court photographer
 Sir Frederick Claude Stern (1884–1967), botanist and horticulturalist, known for developing Highdown Gardens near Worthing, West Sussex
 Dr Friedrich Weleminsky (1868–1945), physician, scientist and a privatdozent in Hygiene (now called Microbiology) at the German University, Prague, who created a treatment for tuberculosis

Gallery

War graves
The cemetery also contains the graves of 24 Commonwealth service personnel that are registered and maintained by the Commonwealth War Graves Commission, 10 from World War I and 14 from World War II.

Transport
The cemetery is easily reached by public transport:
 Bus: H2 passes the entrance; 13, 102 and 460 have stops nearby;
 Underground: Golders Green on the Northern line is a five-minute walk away from the cemetery.

See also
 Balls Pond Road Cemetery
 Jewish cemeteries in the London area
 Movement for Reform Judaism#History
 West London Synagogue#History

References

Sources
 Meller, Hugh & Parsons, Brian (2008). London Cemeteries: an illustrated guide and gazetteer. The History Press. .

External links

Hoop Lane Cemetery on the International Association of Jewish Genealogical Societies website
 

1895 establishments in England
Cemeteries in London
Commonwealth War Graves Commission cemeteries in England
Jewish Cemetery
London, Golders Green
Judaism in London
Religion in the London Borough of Barnet
Sephardi Jewish culture in the United Kingdom